The 2010–11 Weber State Wildcats men's basketball team represented Weber State University in the 2010–11 NCAA Division I men's basketball season. The Wildcats, led by head coach Randy Rahe, played their home games at the Dee Events Center in Ogden, Utah, as members of the Big Sky Conference. The Wildcats finished the regular season 3rd in the Big Sky, and won their first game in the Big Sky tournament. Weber State was eliminated in the semifinals of the tournament by Montana.

Weber State failed to qualify for the NCAA tournament, but were invited to the 2011 College Basketball Invitational. The Wildcats were eliminated in the first round of the CBI in a loss to eventual tournament champion Oregon, 68–59.

Roster 

Source

Schedule and results

|-
!colspan=9 style=|Exhibition

|-
!colspan=9 style=|Regular season

|-
!colspan=9 style=| Big Sky tournament

|-
!colspan=9 style=| Regular season (game added 2/21/11)

|-
!colspan=9 style=| CBI

Source

References

Weber State Wildcats men's basketball seasons
Weber State
Weber State
Weber State men's basketball
Weber State men's basketball